
Certified Medical Reimbursement Specialist (CMRS) is a voluntary national credential that was created specifically for the medical billing professional. The American Medical Billing Association (AMBA) has been providing this industry certification and designation for nearly a decade.

The CMRS designation is awarded by the Certifying Board of the American Medical Billing Association (CBAMBA) after an exam. Although there is no state or federal requirement for a medical billing professional to become certified to practice medical billing, the goal is to provide a professional certification that upholds a high ethical standard of knowledge that recognizes the competency of a certificant.

Composition of the exam
The exam is composed of 16 sections:

 Medical Terminology
 Anatomy & Physiology
 Information Technology
 Web & Information Technology
 ICD-10 Coding
 CPT-4 Coding
 Clearinghouses
 CMS 1500
 Insurance
 Insurance Carriers
 Acronyms
 Compliance
 Fraud & Abuse
 Managed Care
 General
 Case Study

Rules and requirements
 To take the exam and keep the CMRS credential up to date one has to be a member of the AMBA.
 In most instances, exam enrollment will be granted the same day the exam is purchased.
 One has a 45-day period to complete the exam once enrolled.
 One must score 85% or higher overall to pass the exam.
 Upon passing the exam, one is awarded the CMRS designation and mailed a certificate suitable for framing.
 One is required to earn 15 continuing education units (CEUs) each year to maintain the CMRS certification along with a membership in AMBA. Fifty percent of the annual CEUs must come through the association.

Exam textbooks
The current year's HCPCS, CPT-4, and ICD-10 Code Books are needed to take the exam, or you can use a free trial of the AMBA's coding software.

The AMBA offers a CMRS Study Guide. Purchasing the guide is optional but recommended because 80% of the exam is taken from the study guide.

A small portion (5%) of the answers to the CMRS exam can be found in the book Understanding Health Insurance. There are 150 sample questions from the exam in the Workbook, and the answers are in the Instructor's Manual (both sold separately).

References

External links
 AMBA Homepage
 CMRS Homepage
 Full List of CMRS Rules & Requirements

Professional titles and certifications